Es Capdellà (translation from Catalan:  "at the end of there") is a village in the municipality of Calvià on the island of Majorca, part of the Spanish autonomous community of the Balearic Islands. The closest neighboring villages are Galilee and Andratx.

Es Capdellà is a residential area of various nationalities (about 80 by the year 2009).  It has a population of approximately 1,000 inhabitants.

References

 Es Capdellà on mallorcaweb.com

Populated places in Calvià